The Valga Sports Hall is a multi-purpose indoor arena complex in Valga. It was opened in 2005 and is the current home arena of the Estonian Basketball League team BC Valga.

References

External links
 Official website 

Sports venues in Estonia
Basketball venues in Estonia
Indoor arenas in Estonia
Sport in Valga, Estonia
Buildings and structures in Valga County
2005 establishments in Estonia
Sports venues completed in 2005